Holloway is an English surname. Notable people with the surname include:

A. J. Holloway (c.1939–2018), American politician
Adam Holloway (born 1965), English politician
Ariel Williams Holloway (1905–1973), American poet
Baliol Holloway (died 1967), English stage actor
Beatrice Denver Holloway (1884–1964), Australian actress
Beth Holloway (born ), mother of missing American student Natalee Holloway
Brenda Holloway (born 1946), American singer and songwriter
Bruce K. Holloway (1912–1999), United States Air Force general
Bryan R. Holloway (born 1977), American politician from North Carolina
Charles Holloway (disambiguation), several people, including:
 Charles Holloway (cricketer) (1789–1846), English professional cricketer
 Sir Charles Holloway (engineer) (1749–1827), major-general in the Royal Engineers
 Charles Holloway (stage) (1848–1908), Australian actor and manager
 Charles A. Holloway, American professor and business executive
 Charles E. Holloway (died 1962), namesake for Camp Holloway
Clyde C. Holloway (1943–2016), American politician
Condredge Holloway (born 1946), American athlete
Dylan Holloway (born 2001), Canadian ice hockey player
Edmund Holloway (c. 1820–1906), Australian actor
Edward E. Holloway (1908–1993), American physician and politician
Edward James Holloway (1875–1967), Australian politician
Elsie Holloway (1882–1971), Canadian photographer 
Henry Holloway (1932–1999), Australian rugby league footballer and coach
Ian Holloway (born 1963), English football manager
Jack Holloway (1875–1967), Australian politician
James L. Holloway, Jr. (1898–1984), United States Navy admiral
James L. Holloway III (1922–2019), United States Navy admiral
Jennifer Holloway, American operatic mezzo-soprano and soprano
John Holloway (disambiguation), multiple people
John Holloway (athlete) (1878–1950), British Olympic decathlete
John Holloway (botanist) (1881–1945), New Zealand Anglican priest, botanist
John Holloway (diplomat) (1943–2013), Australian diplomat
John Holloway (musician) (born 1948), British baroque violinist
John Holloway (poet) (1920–1999), British academic and poet
John Holloway (Royal Navy officer) (1744–1826), British governor of Newfoundland
John Holloway (sociologist) (born 1947), Marxist writer
John Holloway (Virginia politician) (1666–1734), mayor of Williamsburg, Virginia
John Chandler Holloway (1826–1901), member Wisconsin State Assembly and State Senate
John Thorpe Holloway (1914–1977), New Zealand alpine explorer and forest ecologist
Jonathan Holloway (disambiguation), multiple people
Jonathan Holloway (artistic director) (born 1970), British festival director
Jonathan Holloway (historian) (born 1967), American historian and President of Rutgers University
Jonathan Holloway (playwright) (born 1955), English playwright and theatre director
Jordan Holloway (born 1996), American baseball player
Josephine Groves Holloway (1898–1988), first African-American woman in scouting in Tennessee
Josh Holloway (born 1969), American actor
Laura Carter Holloway (1843–1930), American journalist, author, and lecturer
Liddy Holloway (1947–2004), New Zealand actress
Loleatta Holloway (1946–2011), American gospel singer
Max Holloway (born 1991), American mixed martial artist
Nancy Holloway (1932–2019), American jazz singer
Natalee Holloway (born 1986), American who disappeared in Aruba in May 2005
Patrice Holloway (born 1948), American soul and pop singer
Ralph Holloway (born 1935), American physical anthropologist
Red Holloway (1927–2012), American blues and jazz saxophonist
Richard Holloway (born 1933), Scottish writer, broadcaster and Bishop of Edinburgh
Robin Holloway (born 1943), English composer
Ron Holloway (born 1953), American tenor saxophonist
Shaheen Holloway (born 1976), American basketball coach and former professional player, currently the head coach of the St. Peter's Peacocks
Stanley Holloway (1890–1982), British actor and comic entertainer
Sterling Holloway (1905–1992), American voice actor
Thomas Holloway (1800–1883), English patent medicine vendor and philanthropist
Tu Holloway (born 1989), American basketball player for Maccabi Rishon LeZion in the Israeli Basketball Premier League.
Vernon Caryle Holloway, Sr. (1919–2000), American politician from Florida
William J. Holloway (1888–1970), American principal, lawyer, and politician
William James Holloway (1843–1913), Australian actor in London and South Africa
William Judson Holloway Jr. (1923–2014) United States federal judge, son of the politician
William Holloway (cricketer) (1870–1907), British army officer and England cricketer

Fictional characters:
Grace Holloway, character in 1996 British television movie Doctor Who
Joan Holloway (born 1931), character in American television series Mad Men
Zoe Holloway (Dominion), character in American television series Dominion

English-language surnames